Trecastelli is an Italian comune in the province of Ancona, in Marche, created in 2014 from the merger of the comuni of Ripe, Castel Colonna and Monterado. These three towns are now frazioni of the administration. The  municipal seat is in Ripe.
 
The municipality borders with Corinaldo, Mondolfo, Monte Porzio, Ostra, San Costanzo  and Senigallia.

References

External links

Official website

 
Cities and towns in the Marche